Piccolissimo is a 3D printed single-motor micro drone that is the size of a coin created by engineers at the University of Pennsylvania and named after its creator Matt Piccoli.

Piccolissimo—meaning "smallest" in Italian and a pun on the creator's surname—is claimed to be the world's smallest self-powered, controllable flying robot. The size of a quarter, it has just two moving parts: the propeller and the 3D-printed body, each of which spins at a different speed. It weighs 2.5 grams and has a payload limit of one gram. A slightly larger and heavier model that is steerable has been developed.

Researchers hope that their drones can be used in swarms for search-and-rescue operations.

References

External links
 Piccolissimo website at the University of Pennsylvania

Micro air vehicles
University of Pennsylvania
3D printed objects